William McKendree Snyder (December 20, 1848  – September 1930) was an American painter active in Indiana in the late 19th and early 20th centuries best known for detailed Indiana landscapes.  He was one of the first artists to paint in Brown County, Indiana making him a forerunner of the Brown County Art Colony.

He was born in Liberty, Indiana to a prominent Methodist minister, William W. Snyder.  The family later moved to Madison, Indiana and it was there that Snyder is best known for his landscape paintings of southern Indiana Beech trees, though he was also known to paint portraits, still lifes, and other subjects.  heavily influenced by the Hudson River School, Snyder studied with some America's most important artists of the day including Albert Bierstadt, Charles Warren Eaton, William Morris Hunt and George Inness.

Snyder's work is highly sought after today and is held in numerous public and private collections including the Indiana State Museum and Hanover College.

External links
 
 Snyder bio
 photo of Snyder by Frank Hohenberger

1848 births
1930 deaths
People from Liberty, Indiana
People from Madison, Indiana
Painters from Indiana
19th-century American painters
American male painters
20th-century American painters
19th-century American male artists
20th-century American male artists